Love Love? (stylized as LOVE♥LOVE?) is a Japanese anime television series directed by Takeo Takahashi. It is a sequel to the series Hit o Nerae! (Smash Hit), with character design by Miwa Oshima. The plot centers on the relationships between screenwriter Naoto Ohizumi, and the all-female cast of a Super Sentai TV show he works on.

The series was broadcast on Sun TV and TV Kanagawa from May 3, 2004, to June 28, 2004. An additional 4 episodes were released as straight to DVD OVAs.

Story

Naoto Ohizumi is the screenwriter for the all-female Super Sentai TV show, The Super Transforming Cosmopolitan Prayers ("Cosprayers"), although this is only known by the show's producer. Naoto has a crush on one of the show's stars, Natsumi Yagami. As the show proceeds so does their relationship, with many twists and turns along the way. Many of the other actresses are also in love with Naoto, creating various situations throughout the anime.

Characters

 Naoto is the main protagonist of the series. He is a 17-year-old script writer of the fictional children's TV show Cosprayers, although apparently only the show's producer, Mitsuki Ikita, is aware of this. To the rest of the cast he is simply the Making Of camera man. It is later revealed that the whole cast had secretly known that Naoto was the script writer from that start. During the first episode he has an intimate encounter with each of the show's actresses and he gradually starts developing feelings for the show's main heroine, Natsumi Yagami.

 Natsumi is the main protagonist of Chou Henshin Cosprayers. She stars in Cosprayers as Miko Red Rayer (Koto Hoshino). She is 17 years of age and is under the belief that she was only enlisted for her looks and that her acting is of poor quality. Yagami is aware that Naoto is the screenwriter and seduces him for more roles. She falls in love with him after she sees how much of a good person he is.

 She is the 17-year-old that plays the part of Sister Blue Rayer (Scarlet Church) in Cosprayers. She is quite the opposite of her rival Natsumi for although she is confident in her acting skills, she is unsure of her looks. Katsuragi is aware that Naoto is the screenwriter and seduces him for more roles. She ends up developing feelings for Naoto.

 Plays Sari Yellow Rayer (Priscilla) in Cosprayers. She is a 14 years old tomboy, who grew up with 6 older brothers. Jougasaki is aware that Naoto is the screenwriter and tries to seduce Naoto but fails.

 She plays the part of Rabian Pink/Purple Rayer (Remy) in Cosprayers and is especially skilled at imitating voices. Her short height and childish behavior commonly lead people to believe she is younger than her actual age of 14. Inamura is aware that Naoto is the screenwriter, she also has feelings for Naoto and get frustrated because he never notices her.

 At age 11, she is the youngest member of the cast, starring as Dian Green Rayer (Dian Iko). She has a fear of heights which frequently causes problems during stunts. She actually likes the producer nicknamed Dracula. Hayasaka is aware that Naoto is the screenwriter.

 Mitsuki is the main protagonist of Hit wo Nerae!. She is often mistaken for a grade schooler due to her height and appearance and is the show's producer.

Anime

Love Love? was produced by m.o.e. and directed by Takeo Takahashi, with character designs by Miwa Oshima and music by Toshihiko Sahashi. The opening theme was "(LOVE)∞" by Miyu Matsuki, Sanae Kobayashi, Sayaka Ohara, Mayumi Yoshida, and Kiyomi Asai, and the closing theme was "Only You" by Ayano Ahane. The series was licensed for a release in North America, released in May 2013.

The series was broadcast on Sun TV and TV Kanagawa between May 3, 2004 and June 28, 2004. An additional 4 episodes never aired, but were instead released as straight to DVD OVAs. The series was released on 4 DVDs between July 14, 2004 and September 1, 2004.

See also
 Cho Henshin CosPrayers

References

External links
 

2004 anime television series debuts
Comedy anime and manga
Harem anime and manga
Maiden Japan